Daniel Stephen Gaunt (born 14 November 1978) is an Australian professional golfer.

Gaunt was born in Lancefield, Victoria near Melbourne. His brother Chris is also a professional golfer. He lives in New Malden, England, with his wife, Caroline, and four children.  He tied with Terry Pilkadaris for the Australian Medal in 1997 and turned professional in 1999.

His nickname "Peter Pan" comes from the fact he’s always fighting a hook.

Gaunt qualified for the European Tour via qualifying school at the end of 2003. He was unable to retain his card, and has played predominantly on lower level tours since 2005. He has won several events on those tours including four victories on the third-tier PGA EuroPro Tour.

In July 2010 Gaunt won the English Challenge on Europe's second tier Challenge Tour which gave him a year's exemption on that tour. He ended the season in 7th place on the Challenge Tour Rankings to earn his card on the top level European Tour for 2011.

Amateur wins
1997 Australian Medal (tied with Terry Pilkadaris)

Professional wins (8)

Challenge Tour wins (2)

Challenge Tour playoff record (1–0)

PGA EuroPro Tour wins (4)

MENA Tour wins (1)

Jamega Pro Golf Tour wins (1)

Results in major championships

Note: Gaunt only played in The Open Championship.

Team appearances
Amateur
Australian Men's Interstate Teams Matches (representing Victoria): 1996, 1997, 1998

See also
2010 Challenge Tour graduates
2012 European Tour Qualifying School graduates

References

External links

Daniel Gaunt at the PGA EuroPro Tour official site

Australian male golfers
European Tour golfers
Sunshine Tour golfers
Golfers from Melbourne
People from Lancefield, Victoria
1978 births
Living people